"Best I Can" is a song by American band Queensrÿche appearing on their 1990 album Empire. The song was released as the third single from the album. 

In a November 2010 interview with Get Ready To Rock, front man Geoff Tate said of this uptempo track:

"It was a situation of us writing about handicapped people and their determination to reach their goals. A lot of people really embraced that song, people with serious disadvantages, and we are happy about that as it was a rallying song to get behind of and kind of inspired them to seek their goals and move in the right direction."

Track listing

Chart performance

Personnel
 Geoff Tate – lead vocals
 Chris DeGarmo – lead guitar, backing vocals, keyboards
 Michael Wilton – rhythm guitar
 Eddie Jackson – bass, backing vocals
 Scott Rockenfield – drums

References

Queensrÿche songs
1990 songs
1991 singles
Songs written by Chris DeGarmo
EMI America Records singles
Song recordings produced by Peter Collins (record producer)